Thazhamon Madom is the family of the tantris of Sabarimala. The members of this madom are the head priests of Sabarimala temple for many years. This madom is in Mundencavu in Chengannur of central Kerala. The Padi Pooja, Udayasthamana Pooja and Kalasa Poojas cannot be conducted unless the Tantri is present during the ceremony. The tantri, or his representative is required to be present at the temple premises whenever the temple is open.

History
History the origin of these families dates back to the time of Sage Parasurama. After reclaiming the land of Kerala, he decided to install temples all around, and needed tantris to conduct the rituals. He went to the region that is current Andhra Pradesh and identified two brothers for the job.

In order to test the supremacy of the two Brahmins, the sage asked them to cross a river. The first nambuthri walked over the current to the other bank. But the second nambuthri stopped the flow of the river and walked through the river bed. Seeing this, Parasurama was pleased with them and granted them the following titles. The Brahmin who walked over the water was called Tharananelloor (In traditional Malayalam, Tharanam means to cross), the other priest was called Thazhamon (the one who walked on the sand below the river). The sage also bestowed the title Kandararu to the Thazhamon family. The eldest tantri Kandararu Neelakantaru, died on 19 December 2005. Kandararu Maheshwararu died on 14 May 2018. The present tantris are Kandararu Rajeevaru, Kandararu Mohanraru and Kandararu Mahesh. They take yearly turns to discharge the responsibilities.

References

Culture of Pathanamthitta district